Good Girls Get High is a 2018 film directed by Laura Terruso and written by Terruso and Jennifer Nashorn Blankenship. It stars Abby Quinn, Stefanie Scott, Lauren Lapkus, Matt Besser, Isabelle Fuhrman, Danny Pudi, Chanté Adams, and Booboo Stewart. It premiered at the Los Angeles Film Festival on September 22, 2018, and became available on DirecTV on October 10, 2019, receiving a limited theatrical release beginning November 8.

Plot
Two overachieving high school seniors decide to get high in order to prove themselves to their classmates and find themselves barreling through a night that spirals beyond their intentions.

Cast
Abby Quinn as Sam
Stefanie Scott as Danielle
Lauren Lapkus as Patty
Matt Besser as Larry
Isabelle Fuhrman as Morgan
Danny Pudi as Mr. D
Chanté Adams as Ashanti
Booboo Stewart as Jeremy
Miles McKenna as Pizza Ken

Reception
On review aggregator website Rotten Tomatoes the film has an approval rating of  based on  critics. On Metacritic, the film have an above average score of 63 out of 100 based on four critics, indicating "generally favorable reviews".

Frank Scheck of The Hollywood Reporter said that "The film is sweetly amusing throughout, knowing enough not to wear out its welcome thanks to its fast-paced 77-minute running time".

Courtney Howard of Variety said "This concept teen comedy about female friendship and panic over the onset of adulthood distinguishes itself in a crowded genre".

References

External links

Alloy Entertainment films
2010s English-language films